Deed Poll is a 2004 German erotic thriller short film directed by Ingo J. Biermann. The film stars Barbara Kowa, Rainer-Maria Wittenauer, André Schneider, Gianni Meurer, and Martina Schaak.

Plot
Deed Poll tells the story of Ivy and Sean Poll, rich siblings and lovers. After Ivy has killed both their parents, they start kicking in the high gear on their inherited property. They hire a callboy, Nathaniel, to share their sexual fantasies, and their passion for drugs and cards. One night, Nathaniel has brought his mute brother Thor for a foursome, Ivy expresses her wish to have a new set of cards, handmade out of human skin. Nathaniel, on ecstasy, offers his skin and watches the Polls and his brother playing cards with it while he's passing away.

Cast
 Barbara Kowa as Ivy Poll
 Rainer-Maria Wittenauer as Sean Poll
 André Schneider as Nathaniel Griffin
 Gianni Meurer as Thor Griffin
 Martina Schaak as Dr. Leitziger

External links
 

2000s erotic thriller films
2004 films
2004 short films
2004 thriller films
Erotic short films
German black-and-white films
German erotic thriller films
German short films
2000s English-language films
2000s German films